Luo Bao Bei is a British-Chinese animated television series, produced by "Magic Mall Entertainment" in Beijing and Cloth Cat Animation, and was distributed by 9 Story Media Group. The show follows Luo Bao Bei, a bright and spirited seven-year-old girl with a vivid imagination, on a quest to understand the world around her.

Premise
The series stars a 7-year-old girl, Luo Bao Bei (also known as LBB), as she navigates childhood and the world around her. Fantasy and dreams add elements of surrealism. Since then, Luo has acted as a Beijing city spokesperson and road safety icon involved in community outreach programs.

Characters

Main

 Luo Bao Bei (voiced by Hana Burnett): The main character of the series. She loves her friends, and solving problems. She likes to blow her party blower from her hair. Her friends mainly call her by her initials, LBB. When she does something wrong, her imaginary friend Pink Bear helps her put it right.
 Dad (voiced by Gok Wan)
 Mum (voiced by Ching-He Huang)
 Grandma (voiced by Pik-Sen Lim)
 Grandpa (voiced by David Yip)
 Timmy (voiced by Leo Tang) is one of LBB's best friends. He is the only male friend of LBB's friends. He is sometimes curious.
 Faye (voiced by Natalia-Jade Jonathan) is one of LBB's best friends. She is sometimes sensitive and stubborn.
 Pink Bear is LBB's imaginary friend. He is a stuffed pink bear wearing a yellow napkin tied around his neck. He helps LBB solve problems when she does something wrong. He pops out emoticon bubbles when he has feeling about LBB's troubles. He takes her to an imaginary place for LBB to know what is right.
 Mao Mao is LBB's pet cat. He loves LBB, but he is egotistical and he always loves to nap, but he loves to have fun in imagination.
 Uncle Ray (voiced by Gok Wan)

Other characters
 Anna (voiced by Emily May) is Timmy's cousin from Australia. She is a main character in the season 1 episode "Replaced".

Production 
The production was acknowledged as an official project as early as 2017. The show is known for its heavy emphasis on high-level detailed environment and high quality animation.

In November 2018, Magic Mall and Cloth Cat announced that they are going to produce a second season for the series.

On April 9, 2019, 9 Story made a distribution deal with Netflix to pick up the show's “second window” rights. The show premiered on the platform on August 31, 2019.

Episodes

Season 1 (2018)

Episode releases in Australia were on weekdays, starting on 19 February to 1 May 2018.

Releases in the United Kingdom were on weekdays, starting from 7 May to 17 July 2018.

Broadcast 
The series mainly broadcasts on Channel 5’s Milkshake in the UK on 7 May 2018, ABC Kids in Australia on 19 February 2018, E-Junior in the UAE and CCTV in China. The series is also broadcast on France Télévisions in France, Canal Panda in Spain and Portugal, Clan in Spain, SVT in Sweden, True Visions in Thailand and HOP! in Israel. The series premiered on Netflix in the United States on August 31, 2019.

References

External links
 

2010s British animated television series
2010s British children's television series
British children's animated adventure television series
British children's animated fantasy television series
British preschool education television series
Chinese children's animated adventure television series
Chinese children's animated fantasy television series
Anime-influenced Western animated television series
Animated television series about children
Animated preschool education television series
2010s preschool education television series